Doşulu is a village in the Jabrayil Rayon of Azerbaijan. Azerbaijan reportedly captured the village on October 15, 2020.

References

Populated places in Jabrayil District